Hermógenes Irisarri Trucíos (April 19, 1819 – July 22, 1886), was a Chilean poet, journalist, diplomat and political figure.

He was born in Santiago, the son of Antonio José de Irisarri Alonso and of Mercedes Trucíos y Larraín. He studied at the National Institute. But he did not stay there for long, opting instead to leave the environment of the classroom for the world of writing.

Career
He began his career as a public writer in " El Seminario," of Santiago in 1840, and was a contributor in prose and verse to a number of the literary papers and magazines of Chile. He was one of the stalwarts of the literary movement of 1842. In 1847, he wrote the play El Comercio. The following year he began contributing to The Journal of Santiago, frequently publishing poems in it. He was the director of the biographical work "Galeria de hombres celebres de Chile." In 1857 he was elected deputy to the National congress. In 1860 he was honored by the five Central American republics with the appointment as their representative in Chile, and in 1863 went in that capacity to Peru, where for some time he was editor of the political paper "El Heraldo de Lima." In 1866 he returned to Chile, and in the same year was elected deputy and vice president of congress. President José Joaquín Pérez invited him several times to take a seat in his cabinet, but he declined. He was elected to the senate in 1873, but took no active part in politics. Under President Federico Errázuriz Zañartu, he was councillor of state, but in 1877 resigned to live in retirement on his estate at Quilpue. His poems include "Al Sol de Septiembre," "A San Martin," and "La Mujer Adultera."

Marriage
Trucíos married Ana Rosa Huici Luco. They had one son, Alfredo.

References

External links
 

1819 births
1886 deaths
People from Santiago
Members of the Senate of Chile
Members of the Chamber of Deputies of Chile
Chilean diplomats
Chilean journalists
19th-century Chilean historians
Chilean male poets
19th-century journalists
Male journalists
19th-century Chilean poets
19th-century male writers